Commodore Sir Sidney Smith in  took a flotilla of seven French gun-vessels at Acre on 18 March 1799. The French flotilla was carrying siege artillery and other siege supplies to reinforce Napoleon's troops besieging Acre. Smith immediately put the guns and supplies to use to help the denizens of the city resist the French, and the gun-vessels to harass them.

Citations

French campaign in Egypt and Syria
Lists of captured ships